Orascom Construction PLC (OC) is an engineering, procurement and construction (EPC) contractor based in Cairo, Egypt. The company was Egypt's first multinational corporation and stands at the core of the Orascom Group companies. OC is active in more than 25 countries.

History

OC was established in Egypt in 1950 and owned by Onsi Sawiris. It owned and operated cement plants in Egypt, Algeria, Turkey, Pakistan, Iraq, North Korea and Spain, which had a combined annual production capacity of 21 million tonnes.

In December 2007, OC announced the divestment of its cement group, Orascom Building Materials Holding (OBMH), the holding company for its cement group assets, to the French Lafarge.

In July 2011, Orascom Construction won a $450 million bid in Saudi Arabia.

In September 2012, Orascom Construction expanded in the US by building a nitrogen fertilizer plant in Iowa and buying out The Weitz Company. In 2013, Cascade Investment invested $1 billion in Orascom Construction. Following this investment, a Netherlands-based company, OCI NV, was created, and became the parent company of Orascom Construction.

In March 2015, Orascom Construction shares started trading at the Dubai Financial Market and Cairo's Egyptian Exchange.

In July 2018, Orascom Construction partnered with Engie to build the largest windfarm in Egypt. In May 2019, the consortium Bombardier Inc., Orascom Construction and Arab Contractors won the contract to build two monorail lines in Cairo.

Sanctions 
In 2013, Orascom Group agreed to pay up to $1 billion in tax fines to the Egyptian tax collector following irregularities in the 2007 sale to Lafarge.

See also
Orascom Telecom Holding

References

External links
 Orascom Construction website

Construction and civil engineering companies of Egypt
Orascom Group
Construction and civil engineering companies established in 1950
Companies based in Cairo
Egyptian companies established in 1950
Companies listed on the Egyptian Exchange